The Pandolfini Italian Culinary Academy is an Italian private professional culinary institute located in the town of Lastra a Signa (Ponte a Signa) in the former county of San Martino a Gangalandi, a few miles from Florence, Italy.

The school was founded in 1999 as a school for foreign students  with a trade name of "Good Tastes Of Tuscany". Initially the main kitchen was located in Villa Pandolfini then it expanded to a second professional kitchen in the medieval construction named “La Torre Pandolfini “. This ancient palace was the site of the 1494 summit between Pier Capponi, chief of the republic of Florence, and Charles VIII king of France, who had invaded Italy.

The Pandolfini Academy of Italian Cuisine is a cooking school for aspiring professional chefs. The school also offers hands on cooking classes and non-professional courses to foreign travellers, teenagers, and adults, and organizes culinary vacation.

External links 
official site
official site in Italian
Education in Florence
Cooking schools in Europe